

Richard Zimmer (21 June 1893  – 20 June 1971) was a German general in the Wehrmacht during World War II who commanded the 17th Infantry Division. He was a recipient of the Knight's Cross of the Iron Cross of Nazi Germany.

Awards 

 German Cross in Gold on 8 June 1942 as Oberst in Gebirgs-Pionier-Regiment 620
 Knight's Cross of the Iron Cross on 16 October 1944 as Generalleutnant and commander of 17. Infanterie-Division

References

Citations

Bibliography

 
 

1893 births
1971 deaths
People from Schwäbisch Gmünd
Lieutenant generals of the German Army (Wehrmacht)
German Army personnel of World War I
Recipients of the clasp to the Iron Cross, 1st class
Recipients of the Gold German Cross
Recipients of the Knight's Cross of the Iron Cross
People from the Kingdom of Württemberg
Military personnel from Baden-Württemberg
German Army generals of World War II